Christian Mailhiot from the Lawrence Livermore National Laboratory, was awarded the status of Fellow in the American Physical Society, after they were nominated by their Division of Materials Physics in 2003, for his outstanding contributions and scientific leadership in theoretical and computational condensed matter and materials physics, with particular emphasis on innovative discoveries related to quantum-confined semiconductor structures and high-pressure research.

References 

Fellows of the American Physical Society
American Physical Society
American physicists